Harold Edward Frankham  (1911–1996) was an Anglican priest.

Harold Frankham was born on 6 April 1911 and ordained in 1941.  He began his career with curacies in  Luton  and Brompton. He held incumbencies in  Addiscombe, Middleton and Luton before being appointed Provost of Southwark Cathedral in 1970. He retired 12 years later and died on 17 January 1996.

References

1911 births
1996 deaths
20th-century English Anglican priests
Provosts and Deans of Southwark